The 2004 Proximus Spa 24 Hours was the 57th running of the Spa 24 Hours and the seventh round the 2004 FIA GT Championship season.  This event combined the FIA GT's two classes (GT and N-GT) with cars from national series and one-make series, designated G2 and G3.  It took place at the Circuit de Spa-Francorchamps, Belgium, from 31 July to 1 August 2004.

Half-point leaders
For the FIA GT Championship, the top eight cars in the GT and N-GT classes are awarded half points for their positions after six hours and twelve hours into the race.  Points to the top eight were awarded in the order of 4.0 – 3.0 – 2.5 – 2.0 – 1.5 – 1.0 – 0.5.

6 Hour leaders in GT

6 Hour leaders in N-GT

12 Hour leaders in GT

12 Hour leaders in N-GT

Official results
Class winners in bold.  Cars failing to complete 70% of winner's distance marked as Not Classified (NC).

Statistics
 Pole position – #2 BMS Scuderia Italia – 2:15.047
 Fastest lap – #13 G.P.C. Giesse Squadra Corse – 2:18.111
 Average speed – 161.974 km/h

References

 
 
 

S
Spa
Spa 24 Hours